Loris Benito Souto (born 7 January 1992) is a Swiss professional footballer who plays as a left-back for Young Boys and the Switzerland national team.

Club career
Benito was born in Aarau, Switzerland. A product of local FC Aarau youth ranks, Benito made his professional debut on 1 November 2009, age 17, under then coach, Martin Andermatt. His performances led to a move in 2012 to FC Zürich.

On 10 March 2013, in an away match against FC Thun, Benito was bitten on the finger by a beech marten he had caught after it invaded the pitch.

After solid performances in the Swiss league, news started about a potential move abroad. On 22 June 2014, Benito signed a five-year deal with Portuguese champions Benfica for an unconfirmed fee of around €2.5 million.

On 18 October 2014, Benito made his debut for Benfica in a win at S.C. Covilhã (2–3) in the third round of Taça de Portugal. On 6 December 2014, he debuted in Primeira Liga in a home win (3–0) against Belenenses.

On 22 February 2015, Benito debuted for Benfica B against Oriental in Segunda Liga.

On 23 June 2015, he returned to Swiss football, signing a four-year contract with BSC Young Boys. His first two seasons back in Switzerland have been almost on the sidelines with injuries including a metatarsal fracture and torn ligaments in his knee.

On 30 January 2022, he signed a 1.5-year contract with Sion.

On 4 July 2022, Benito returned to Young Boys with a three-year contract.

International career
In May 2019, he played in 2019 UEFA Nations League Finals, where his team finished 4th.

In 2021 he was called up to the national team for the 2020 UEFA European Championship, where the team created one of the main sensations of the tournament reaching the quarter-finals.

International goals
Scores and results list Switzerland's goal tally first.

Personal life
He is the nephew of Ivan Benito. Of Spanish descent, Benito is fluent in German, Italian, Spanish, English, Portuguese, and French.

Honours
Benfica
Primeira Liga: 2014–15
Taça da Liga: 2014–15
Supertaça Cândido de Oliveira: 2014

FC Zürich
Swiss Cup: 2013–14

Young Boys
Swiss Super League: 2017–18, 2018–19

References

External links

 
 
 
 

1992 births
Living people
People from Aarau
Swiss men's footballers
Swiss expatriate footballers
Switzerland youth international footballers
Switzerland under-21 international footballers
Switzerland international footballers
Swiss people of Spanish descent
Swiss people of Asturian descent
Swiss people of Galician descent
Association football midfielders
UEFA Euro 2020 players
Swiss Super League players
Primeira Liga players
Liga Portugal 2 players
Ligue 1 players
FC Aarau players
FC Zürich players
S.L. Benfica footballers
S.L. Benfica B players
BSC Young Boys players
FC Girondins de Bordeaux players
FC Sion players
Expatriate footballers in Portugal
Expatriate footballers in France
Swiss expatriate sportspeople in Portugal
Swiss expatriate sportspeople in France
Sportspeople from Aargau